Cryptic Collection is a compilation album by Twiztid. Released on November 13, 2000, it is the first in the Cryptic Collection series, followed by Cryptic Collection Vol. 2 and Vol. 3, each containing rare tracks not available on regular releases.

Track listing 

Notes
Track 1 was an alternate intro from Twiztid's debut album Mostasteless (1997)
Tracks 2, 6, and 11 were remixes of the songs of the same name on Mostasteless (1997)
Tracks 3, 5, 7, and 8 were part of Jamie Madrox's scrapped solo album as Mr. Bones, called Something Weird (1995)
Track 4 was an outtake from the Mostasteless re-issue, talking about not being affected by fame and the new deal with Def Jam (1999)
Track 9 appeared on the first version of Mostasteless and later on Psychopathics From Outer Space Vol. 1 (1997)
Track 10 appeared on Jamie Madrox's 1995 solo album as Mr. Bones, Sacrifice, and the 1994 EP The Demon Inside by Mr. Bones and The Sons of Midnight (1994)
Track 12 was two parts, the first one was a song by Psychopathic Records artist Blaze Ya Dead Homie, called "Put It Down", and the track was featured on Blaze's 2000 EP, titled Blaze Ya Dead Homie; The second part was an old song by House of Krazees with The R.O.C.'s verses cut (2000/199x)

References

B-side compilation albums
Twiztid compilation albums
2000 compilation albums
Psychopathic Records compilation albums